Blossomfort  is a ringfort (rath) and National Monument (#594) located in County Cork, Ireland.

Location

Blossomfort is located 1 km southwest of Ballyclogh.

History and description
Blossomfort is a circular lios,  in diameter with an entrance in the northeast corner. Ringforts of this type were mostly built c. AD 550–900. Internally people were housed in wooden huts. Another fort lies immediately to the northeast; this may have served as a livestock enclosure.

References

Archaeological sites in County Cork
National Monuments in County Cork